Sexual Recovery Anonymous (SRA) founded circa  1993 is one of several twelve-step programs for the treatment of sexual addiction based on the original Twelve Steps of Alcoholics Anonymous. SRA takes its place among various 12-step groups that seek recovery from sexual addiction: Sex Addicts Anonymous, Sex and Love Addicts Anonymous, Sexual Compulsives Anonymous and Sexaholics Anonymous. The New York-based group has meetings in several states. Collectively these groups are referred to as "S" groups since all their acronyms begin with that letter.

There is a related group called SRA-ANON for spouses, relatives, friends, and significant others of SRA members. This group is analogous to Al-Anon for family members of Alcoholics Anonymous (AA).

SRA was founded around 1993 and is said to be a "progressive offshoot" of Sexaholics Anonymous (SA) and is said to be "far more diverse" with a strong presence of women, African Americans, Asians, and members of the LGBT community. SRA also differs from SA by allowing sexual relations between two people in a “committed relationship”, while SA only allows a heterosexual spouse as an acceptable partner.

See also 
 Hypersexuality
 List of twelve-step groups

References

External links
Sexual Recovery Anonymous - official website
SRA Tristate Intergroup - the official website for SRA in the tri-state area

Twelve-step programs
Human sexuality organizations
Sexual addiction
LGBT family and peer support groups
Non-profit organizations based in New York (state)